Code Camp is a form of unconference. Originating with the goal of helping developers who could not make it to work during regular hours, the project offers technical presentations and provides access to technical content.  Started in Boston by Thom Robbins and a handful of local developer community leaders, Code Camps went on to influence the creation of other "Camp" style events such as BarCamp.  As they evolved, Code Camp has moved away from being strictly limited to the Microsoft Windows or .NET platforms.

Code Camps are free to attend, and they typically do not take place during the work week.

Like most unconferences, Code Camps are focused on the local or regional development community. Presenters are typically also members of the community. Presentation topics are often suggested and presented by attendees.

References

External links
 List of Code Camps across US
 Chicago Code Camp

Unconferences
Software development events
21st-century introductions